Exeter Book Riddle 61 (according to the numbering of the Anglo-Saxon Poetic Records) is one of the Old English riddles found in the later tenth-century Exeter Book. The riddle is usually solved as 'shirt', 'mailcoat' or 'helmet'. It is noted as one of a number of Old English riddles with sexual connotations and as a source for gender-relations in early medieval England.

Text

As edited by Krapp and Dobbie in the Anglo-Saxon Poetic Records series (with the addition of marking of long vowels), and translated by Megan Cavell, Riddle 61 runs:

Often a noble woman, a lady, locked me
fast in a chest, sometimes she drew me up
with her hands and gave me to her husband,
her loyal lord, as she was bid.
Then he stuck his head in the heart of me,
upward from beneath, fitted it in the tight space.
If the strength of the receiver was suitable,
something shaggy had to fill
me, the adorned one. Determine what I mean.

References

Riddles
Old English literature
Old English poetry